The 2012 Ole Miss Rebels football team represented the University of Mississippi in the 2012 NCAA Division I FBS football season. The team was coached by Hugh Freeze, who was in his first season with Ole Miss. The Rebels played their home games at Vaught–Hemingway Stadium in Oxford, Mississippi, and competed in the Western Division of the Southeastern Conference (SEC).

On February 11, 2019, Ole Miss announced the vacation of all wins in the years 2010, 2011, 2012, and 2016. In 2013, all wins except the Music City Bowl were vacated. In 2014, all wins except the Presbyterian game were vacated.

Personnel

Coaching staff

Previous season
The Rebels came off a disappointing season in which they went 2–10 and went winless in SEC play. As a result, Ole Miss head coach Houston Nutt resigned after compiling a 24–26 record in four seasons. The Rebels also began the year with a new Athletic Director, Ross Bjork, who replaced Pete Boone in the preceding spring.

Schedule

Game summaries

Central Arkansas

Sources:

UTEP

Sources:

Texas

Sources:

Tulane

Sources: ESPN

Alabama

Sources:

Texas A&M

Sources:

Auburn

Sources:

Arkansas

Sources:

Georgia

Sources:

Vanderbilt

Sources:

LSU

Sources:

Mississippi State

Sources:

Pittsburgh

Sources:

References

Ole Miss
Ole Miss Rebels football seasons
Birmingham Bowl champion seasons
Ole Miss Rebels football